Tomáš Huber (born 29 August 1985) is a Czech professional football defender, who currently plays for FK DAC 1904 Dunajská Streda.

External links

1985 births
Living people
Sportspeople from Jablonec nad Nisou
Czech footballers
Czech expatriate footballers
Czech First League players
FK Jablonec players
AC Sparta Prague players
FK Baník Sokolov players
MFK Ružomberok players
FC DAC 1904 Dunajská Streda players
Slovak Super Liga players
2. Liga (Slovakia) players
Expatriate footballers in Slovakia
Czech expatriate sportspeople in Slovakia

Association football defenders